The 1997–98 Nebraska Cornhuskers men's basketball team represented the University of Nebraska, Lincoln during the 1997–98 college basketball season. Led by head coach Danny Nee (12th season), the Cornhuskers competed in the Big 12 Conference and played their home games at the Bob Devaney Sports Center. They finished with a record of 20–12 overall and 10–6 in Big 12 Conference play. After placing 4th in the conference standings, and losing in the semifinals of the Big 12 tournament, Nebraska received an at-large bid to the NCAA tournament – the fifth and final appearance under Coach Nee – as No. 11 seed in the West region. The Cornhuskers were beaten by No. 6 seed Arkansas in the opening round.

Roster

Schedule and results 

|-
!colspan=12 style=| Regular season

|-
!colspan=12 style=| Big 12 Tournament

|-
!colspan=12 style=| NCAA Tournament

Team players drafted into the NBA

References

Nebraska
Nebraska Cornhuskers men's basketball seasons
Nebraska
Corn
Corn